Tamara Deverell is a Canadian art director and production designer. She was nominated for an Academy Award in the category Best Production Design for the film Nightmare Alley.

Selected filmography 
 Nightmare Alley (2021; co-nominated with Shane Vieau)
 Priscilla (film) TBA

References

External links 

website

Living people
Place of birth missing (living people)
Year of birth missing (living people)
American art directors
American production designers